Yenifer Yuliet Giménez Gamboa (born 3 May 1996) is a Venezuelan professional footballer who plays as a centre back for Spanish Liga F club Villarreal CF and the Venezuela women's national team.

International career
Giménez represented Venezuela at the 2015 South American U-20 Women's Championship and the 2016 FIFA U-20 Women's World Cup. At senior level, she played two Copa América Femenina editions (2014 and 2018) and two Central American and Caribbean Games editions (2014 and 2018).

References

External links
Yenifer Giménez's stats at StatsFootFeminin.fr 

1996 births
Living people
Women's association football central defenders
Women's association football midfielders
Venezuelan women's footballers
Sportspeople from Barquisimeto
Venezuela women's international footballers
Competitors at the 2014 Central American and Caribbean Games
Central American and Caribbean Games bronze medalists for Venezuela
Competitors at the 2018 Central American and Caribbean Games
Asociación Civil Deportivo Lara players
América de Cali footballers
FC Aurillac Arpajon Cantal Auvergne players
Thonon Evian Grand Genève F.C. players
Villarreal CF (women) players
Venezuelan expatriate women's footballers
Venezuelan expatriate sportspeople in Colombia
Expatriate women's footballers in Colombia
Venezuelan expatriate sportspeople in France
Expatriate women's footballers in France
Central American and Caribbean Games medalists in football